Cymatonycha meridionalis is a species of beetle in the family Cerambycidae. It was described by Martins and Galileo in 1995. It is known from Colombia and Venezuela.

References

Desmiphorini
Beetles described in 1995